Jhojan Orlando García Sosa (born 10 January 1998) is a Colombian cyclist, who currently rides for UCI ProTeam . In October 2020, he was named in the startlist for the 2020 Vuelta a España.

Major results
2016
 1st Overall Junior Vuelta a Colombia
2019
 1st  Young rider classification Vuelta a la Comunidad de Madrid
 National Under–23 Road Championships
2nd Road race
2nd Time trial
 8th Overall Tour de l'Avenir
 10th Overall Vuelta a Asturias
2021 
 4th Overall Tour de Hongrie
 4th Overall Presidential Tour of Turkey

Grand Tour general classification results timeline

References

External links

1998 births
Living people
Colombian male cyclists
Sportspeople from Bogotá
21st-century Colombian people